The World Figure Skating Championships is an annual figure skating competition sanctioned by the International Skating Union in which figure skaters compete for the title of World Champion.

The 1964 competitions for men's singles, ladies' singles, pair skating, and ice dance took place from February 25 to March 1 in Dortmund, West Germany.

Results

Men

Judges:
 Hans Meixner 
 P. Devine 
 Zdeněk Fikar 
 Gérard Rodrigues-Henriques 
 Adolf Walker 
 Giovanni DeMori 
 H. Konno 
 L. B. Sandersen 
 Georgi Felitsin

Ladies

Judges:
 Walter Malek 
 Donald H. Gilchrist 
 Miroslav Hasenöhrl 
 P. Baron 
 János Zsigmondy 
 Pamela Peat 
 Zoltán Balázs 
 Masao Hasegawa 
 C. Benedict-Stieber

Pairs

Judges:
 Hans Meixner 
 Donald H. Gilchrist 
 Zdeněk Fikar 
 Ercole Cattaneo 
 K. Beyer 
 Zoltán Balázs 
 M. Enderlin 
 Mary Louise Wright 
 Georgi Felitsin

Ice dance

Judges:
 F. Huniacek 
 P. Divine 
 Miroslav Hasenöhrl 
 Erika Schiechtl 
 H. Lawrence 
 J. Kozari 
 Mary Louise Wright

Medal table

Sources
 Result List provided by the ISU

World Figure Skating Championships
World Figure Skating Championships
World Figure Skating Championships
International figure skating competitions hosted by West Germany
Sports competitions in Dortmund
1960s in North Rhine-Westphalia
20th century in Dortmund
World Figure Skating Championships
World Figure Skating Championships
World Figure Skating Championships